J D Wetherspoon plc (branded variously as Wetherspoon or Wetherspoons, and colloquially known as Spoons) is a pub company operating in the United Kingdom and Ireland. The company was founded in 1979 by Tim Martin and is based in Watford. It operates the sub-brand of Lloyds No.1 bars, and around 50 Wetherspoon hotels. Wetherspoon is known for converting unconventional premises, such as former cinemas and banks, into pubs. The company is publicly listed on the London Stock Exchange and is a constituent of the FTSE 250 Index.

History

Tim Martin opened his first pub in 1979 in Colney Hatch Lane in Muswell Hill, London. Many of the other early Wetherspoon pubs were also in the western part of Haringey. The name of the business originates from JD, a character in The Dukes of Hazzard, and Wetherspoon, the surname of one of Martin's teachers in New Zealand, who had told him that he would not amount to anything.

During the 1990s, Wetherspoons began a policy of routinely closing its smaller or less profitable outlets, often replacing them with larger premises close by. In 1998, Wetherspoons introduced the oversized pint glass to promote the "full pint". This initiative was withdrawn, supposedly because customers were still asking for top-ups, but arguably because other pub chains did not follow its lead.

Wetherspoons pioneered non-smoking areas in pubs before the Smoking, Health and Social Care (Scotland) Act 2005, The Smoking (Northern Ireland) Order 2006 and the Health Act 2006 in England and Wales became law in 2006.

The company produces a quarterly in-house magazine, Wetherspoon News, which contains information on the company's activities, its employees, pubs, political views and comments on recent media mentions. The chain also offers a mobile app from which customers can order food and drink to their table to avoid using the bar, even from outside the pub.

On 16 April 2018, Wetherspoons deleted all of its social media profiles. Chairman Tim Martin cited the "current bad publicity surrounding social media, including the trolling of MPs and others" as a reason for the decision.

Brexit
The firm – whose founder is a strong supporter of Brexit – replaced champagne with British sparkling wines and Australian wines on 9 July 2018. The firm stated the goal of this was to sell cheaper drinks and to get cheaper alcohol to its two million weekly customers.

COVID-19

In mid-March 2020 during the COVID-19 pandemic in the United Kingdom, the government advised the public to avoid areas like pubs, clubs, restaurants, and gyms. As a result, many pub chains closed. However, Wetherspoon chairman Tim Martin rejected the government's advice and refused to close a single pub, saying that his instinct was that "closure won’t save lives but will cost thousands of jobs". The government ordered the closure of all pubs from 21 March. The media also reported that Martin refused to pay its 43,000 employees for the period of closure until the furlough costs had been reimbursed by the Government, unlike other national chains which were covering the costs upfront. Martin encouraged Wetherspoons staff to find employment elsewhere, such as the supermarket Tesco. The majority of staff were placed on the Government furlough scheme after its announcement. The Wetherspoon group later suggested that Martin's statement had been reported misleadingly, and said that staff had been paid every week during the closure.

Wetherspoons also told its suppliers in March it would not pay them until its 874 pubs were allowed to reopen after the coronavirus lockdown. In October 2020, Wetherspoons reported its first loss in 36 years. For the year ending in July 2020, the company published a pre-tax loss of £34.1 million; the previous year, it reported a pre-tax profit of £102.5 million.

In March 2021, Wetherspoons reaffirmed its expansion plans including 75 projects, comprising 18 new pubs and 57 significant extensions to existing venues. Martin said that the ten-year project would create 2,000 jobs for staff, but that it would be "conditional on the UK opening back up again on a long-term basis, with no further lockdowns or the constant changing of rules".

Food and drink
Wetherspoon targets a mass-market offering of low-price food and drink. A large standardised menu is available all day in every pub, cultivating a perception of "unpretentious good value". Wetherspoons claims to be "the only large pub firm which opens all its pubs early in the morning", serving breakfast and coffee. The food menu has continually added healthier and allergen-friendly options, including a calorie rating next to every item.

Wetherspoons hosts two Ale Festivals in March/April and October each year when a larger range of guest ales is available in each pub and a Cider Festival in the summer. The company claims to be the biggest investor in craft beer in the country.

Wetherspoons objected to the VAT rates on food sales in pubs and restaurants in the United Kingdom, and the fact they are higher than those paid by supermarkets. VAT rates on alcoholic drinks were the same in both pubs and supermarkets.  When VAT was temporarily reduced from 20% to 5% during the COVID-19 pandemic in 2020, Wetherspoons was one of several chains to pass some of that saving to customers.

Properties and operations

Though some are new-build or late 20th century properties, many Wetherspoon pubs are conversions of existing historic buildings which have become redundant, including banks, churches, post offices, theatres and a former public swimming pool, with many properties being listed buildings. Pubs are furnished thematically according to the heritage of the building or location, and have routinely won design awards.

Every Wetherspoons pub has a unique carpet, each inspired by the pub's name, location and building. They are produced by Axminster Carpets and, having more than the usual six colours, have to be partially handmade on old fashioned looms, costing up to £30,000 – twice as much as stock designs. These have been the subject of a book, Spoons Carpets by Kit Caliss, and a colouring book Colour Your Own Spoons Carpet.

Wetherspoons has placed outlets in the passenger terminals of some UK airports, including Doncaster Sheffield Airport, Edinburgh Airport, Gatwick Airport, Heathrow Airport, and Stansted Airport, as well as at several major railway stations, including Leeds, Liverpool Lime Street, London Cannon Street, London Liverpool Street, and London Victoria. The main station buildings at Aberystwyth railway station were converted to a Wetherspoons pub Yr Hen Orsaf The Old Station and received a National Railway Heritage Award in 2003.

The first Wetherspoon pub in Northern Ireland was The Spinning Mill in Ballymena, County Antrim, which opened in 2000. The first Wetherspoons pub in the Republic of Ireland, The Three Tun Tavern, opened in Blackrock, County Dublin, in 2014. Another opened in Cork in 2015. The Three Tun Tavern closed in January 2022 after it was bought by a consortium of former and current Irish rugby players including Rob Kearney and Jamie Heaslip.

In 2014, Wetherspoons opened a pub at the Beaconsfield motorway service area on the M40. The move was criticised by road safety charities for potentially encouraging drink-driving.

Wetherspoons also operates a chain of hotels. In 2015, there were 34 hotels in England, Wales and Scotland, and also a pub and 100-room hotel in Camden Street, Dublin, Ireland.

Every Wetherspoons establishment in Great Britain was visited by Mags Thomson from 1994 to October 2015. She reached a total of 972, which included 80 that have subsequently closed.

In 2018, the company chose Wolverhampton in the West Midlands as the location of the National JD Wetherspoon Museum. The existing pub, The Moon Under Water on Lichfield Street, would be expanded to take in the whole former Co-Op Department Store, to include a hotel and gift shop. Plans were approved in April 2020.

In 2022, the company announced it was selling 32 of its sites, including the pub at the Beaconsfield motorway service area.

Controversies
In 2015, Wetherspoons were made to pay a total of £24,000 for "direct racial discrimination" to eight individuals who were refused admittance to one of its pubs in north London (The Coronet on Holloway Road, Islington) based on what a judge described as "the stereotypical assumption that Irish travellers and English gypsies cause disorder wherever they go".

References

External links

 

1979 establishments in England
Companies based in Watford
Food and drink companies established in 1979
Companies listed on the London Stock Exchange
Hotel chains in the United Kingdom
Pub chains
Pubs in London
Restaurant groups in the United Kingdom